kdetv is a television capturing program in the KDE application suite (though one of the "Extragear" programs, released separately) that allows Linux and UNIX users to view television programs on their computer, if they have a working TV tuner card installed. The requirements on having a TV tuner card include having an ALSA or OSS-compatible mixer (for audio), and video4linux, video4linux2, or XVideo-input (for video).

Currently the projects website is down and no official knowledge of its status is known. Presumably the project is dead.

See also

 List of free television software

External links
 kdetv at kde-apps.org

Extragear
Free software programmed in C++
Free television software
KDE software
Software that uses Qt